Schrenkiella is a genus of flowering plants belonging to the family Brassicaceae.

Its native range is Southeastern European Russia to Xinjiang.

According to a new research, this plant flourish in extremely salty environment.

Species
Species:
 Schrenkiella parvula (Schrenk) D.A.German & Al-Shehbaz

References

Brassicaceae
Brassicaceae genera